The 2000 Missouri Democratic presidential primary on March 7, 2000 determined the recipient of the state's 92 delegates to the Democratic National Convention in the process to elect the 43rd President of the United States. It was an open primary.

Results

See also
 2000 Missouri Republican presidential primary
 2000 Democratic Party presidential primaries

References

Notes

2000
Missouri
Democratic primary